The Autovía A-24 is a proposed highway in Aragon, Spain between Daroca and Burgos.

It is an upgrade of the N-234 and will link the Autovía A-23 east of Daroca with the Autovía A-2 and Autopista AP-1 at Burgos. It will be 43.3 km.

References

A-24
A-24
A-24